TAL Education Group, which stands for "Tomorrow Advancing Life", is a Chinese holding company that offers after-school education and tutoring for students in primary and secondary school. It is headquartered in Beijing, China. The company was founded in August 2003 by Zhang Bangxin and Cao Yundong, as "Xueersi" (Study and think). 

The company provides standardized test preparation and consultation services for students studying abroad. It offered help to kids who could not go to school due to the COVID-19 pandemic in subjects including mathematics, Chinese, English, and coding. After new rules were issued by the Chinese government preventing for-profit tutoring companies from earning a profit, the company's stock went down significantly, with a projected 70% decrease in 2022 revenue.

In 2018, it acquired CodeMonkey.

References

External links 
 

Chinese companies established in 2003
Companies based in Beijing
Companies listed on the New York Stock Exchange